Hans Flückiger (born 12 January 1926) is a Swiss former cyclist. He competed in the time trial event at the 1948 Summer Olympics.

References

External links
 

1926 births
Possibly living people
Swiss male cyclists
Olympic cyclists of Switzerland
Cyclists at the 1948 Summer Olympics
Cyclists from Zürich